Serhiy Volodymyrovych Shapoval (born 7 February 1990) is a Ukrainian professional footballer who plays as a midfielder for Dalvík/Reynir in Iceland.

Career statistics

Club
Total matches played in Moldavian First League: 86 matches - 11 goals'

Honours
FC Tiraspol
Moldovan Cup: 2012–13

Lee Man
 Hong Kong Sapling Cup: 2018–19

External links
 
 

1990 births
Living people
People from Kyiv Oblast
Ukrainian footballers
Ukrainian expatriate footballers
Expatriate footballers in Moldova
Expatriate footballers in Poland
Expatriate footballers in Belarus
Expatriate footballers in Hong Kong
Expatriate footballers in Iceland
Ukrainian expatriate sportspeople in Moldova
Ukrainian expatriate sportspeople in Poland
Ukrainian expatriate sportspeople in Hong Kong
Ukrainian expatriate sportspeople in Belarus
Ukrainian expatriate sportspeople in Iceland
Ukrainian Premier League players
Ukrainian First League players
Ukrainian Second League players
Hong Kong Premier League players
Belarusian Premier League players
Moldovan Super Liga players
Association football midfielders
FC Nafkom Brovary players
FC Nyva Ternopil players
FC Feniks-Illichovets Kalinine players
FC Lviv players
FC Tiraspol players
FC Chornomorets Odesa players
FC Torpedo-BelAZ Zhodino players
FC Gomel players
Lee Man FC players
FC Dynamo Brest players
FC Peremoha Dnipro players
Dalvík/Reynir players
Sportspeople from Kyiv Oblast